Holy Name Cathedral or the Cathedral of the Holy Name are the names of several cathedrals. 

 Holy Name Cathedral, Brisbane (never completed)
 Holy Name Cathedral, Chicago
 Holy Name Cathedral, Mumbai
 Holy Name Cathedral (Steubenville, Ohio)

See also 
 Holy Name of Jesus Cathedral (disambiguation)